Csongor Boros (born 13 January 1997) is a Serbian-born Hungarian footballer who plays as a defensive midfielder

References

External links
 Csongor Boros at Srbijafudbal

1997 births
Living people
People from Bačka Topola
Serbian footballers
Association football midfielders
FK TSC Bačka Topola players
Serbian First League players
Hungarians in Vojvodina
Serbian emigrants to Hungary